Puya coquimbensis is a species in the family Bromeliaceae. This species is a rare plant found in certain portions of Chile including Punta Teatinos and Cerro La Campana. In La Campana National Park P.coquimbensis is associated with the endangered Chilean Wine Palm, Jubaea chilensis, which palm prehistorically had a much wider distribution.

References
 C. Michael Hogan. 2008. Chilean Wine Palm: Jubaea chilensis, GlobalTwitcher.com, ed. N. Stromberg
 Philip Wilson Rundel, Gloria Montenegro Rizzardini, G. Montenegro and Fabian M. Jaksic. 1998. Landscape Disturbance and Biodiversity in Mediterranean-type Ecosystems, Published by Springer, 447 pages  , 9783540644750

Line notes

Plants described in 1896
coquimbensis